The women's moguls competition in freestyle skiing at the 2022 Winter Olympics was held on 3 February (qualification) and 6 February (final), at the Genting Snow Park in Zhangjiakou. Jakara Anthony of Australia won the event, with Jaelin Kauf of the United States taking silver and Anastasia Smirnova, representing the Russian Olympic Committee, bronze. For all of them this is the first Olympic medal. Antony's medal is the first Olympic medal for Australia in women's moguls.

The defending champion was Perrine Laffont. The silver medalist, who is also the 2014 Olympic champion, Justine Dufour-Lapointe, also qualified for the Olympics, as well as the bronze medalist, Yuliya Galysheva. At the 2021–22 FIS Freestyle Ski World Cup, before the Olympics Anri Kawamura led the ranking, followed by Laffont and Jakara Anthony. Laffont is also the 2021 world champion, with Galysheva and Anastasia Smirnova being the silver and the bronze medalist, respectively.

In the final, Anthony won with the season's best of 83.09 points. Kauf showed the fastest run, but lost to Anthony in air and turns. Smirnova became third, ahead of Laffont, Kawamura, and Olivia Giaccio.

Qualification

A total of 30 moguls athletes qualified to compete at the games. For an athlete to compete they must have a minimum of 80.00 FIS points on the FIS Points List on January 17, 2022 and a top 30 finish in a World Cup event or at the FIS Freestyle Ski World Championships 2021. A country could enter a maximum of four athletes into the event.

Results

Qualifications

Qualifying 1
In the first qualifying round, the ten best athletes directly qualified for the final. The bottom twenty athletes go on to compete in the second qualification round.

Qualifying 2
In the second qualifying round, the ten best athletes qualify for the final based on that athletes best score from either the athlete's first or second qualifying run. The bottom ten athletes are eliminated.

Final

Final 1
In the first final round, the twelve best athletes qualified for the second final round. The bottom eight athletes are eliminated.

Final 2
In the second final round, the six best athletes qualified for the third final round. The bottoms six athletes are eliminated.

Final 3
The third final round determined the medal winners amongst the final six athletes.

References

Women's freestyle skiing at the 2022 Winter Olympics